In game theory, a contingent cooperator is a person or agent who is willing to act in the collective interest, rather than his short-term selfish interest, if he observes a majority of the other agents in the collective doing the same. The apparent contradiction in this stance is resolved by game theory, which shows that in the right circumstances, cooperation with a sufficient number of other participants will have a better outcome for cooperators than pursuing short-term selfish interests.

See also
 Cooperation
 Iterated prisoner's dilemma
 Tit for tat

External links
 Ronald A. Heiner. Robust Evolution of Contingent Cooperation in Pure One-Shot Prisoners' Dilemmas. Discussion Papers Nos. 2002-09 and 2002–09, Center for the Study of Law and Economics discussion paper series, 2002.
 Christopher Wilson. “I Will if You Will: Facilitating Contingent Cooperation”, Optimum Online, Vol. 37, Issue 1, Apr 2007

Game theory